Plum-yew is a common name for several plants and may refer to:
Cephalotaxus
Prumnopitys